Loricosaurus (meaning "armour lizard") is a genus of sauropod represented by a single species. It is a titanosaurian that lived near the end of the Late Cretaceous period, approximately 71 million years ago in the early Maastrichtian. Found in the province of Neuquen, Argentina in the Allen Formation. Due to the presence of armour, at first it was thought that it was an ankylosaur, but today it is considered to be the armour of a titanosaur.

Armour
The armour of Loricosaurus has caused some controversy. When Huene first described it, he considered it to be from an ankylosaur. Later, it was discovered to not belong to ankylosaurs, but to belong to titanosaurs. Now it is considered to possibly belong to Neuquensaurus or Saltasaurus.

Species
In 1929 von Huene described Loricosaurus based on some armour osteoderms found in Argentina. The type species, Loricosaurus scutatus, is now considered possibly a synonym of Neuquensaurus.

See also
†Neuquensaurus
†Saltasaurus

References

Saltasaurids
Late Cretaceous dinosaurs of South America
Cretaceous Argentina
Fossils of Argentina
Allen Formation
Fossil taxa described in 1929
Taxa named by Friedrich von Huene